Jaume Vicent Costa Jordá (born 18 March 1988) is a Spanish professional footballer who plays as a left-back for RCD Mallorca.

He spent most of his career at Villarreal, making 268 appearances, and also had two spells with Valencia.

Club career

Valencia
Born in Valencia, Valencian Community, Costa played youth football with local giants Valencia CF, but almost exclusively in the B team, with whom he competed in both Segunda División B and Tercera División. He made his only first-team appearance on 4 December 2008 in a UEFA Cup home game against Club Brugge KV, and played the first 55 minutes of the 1–1 group stage draw before being substituted for Vicente Rodríguez. 

Costa was loaned to Cádiz CF of the Segunda División for the 2009–10 season, appearing in less than half of the matches and also suffering relegation.

Villarreal
Costa joined neighbours Villarreal CF in the summer of 2010, being initially assigned to the reserves also in the second division. He played his first match in La Liga with the main squad on 4 March 2012, featuring the full 90 minutes in a 2–1 away loss against Real Zaragoza. At the end of the campaign both the first and the second squads dropped down a tier, even though the latter finished in a comfortable 12th position, with 29 games and one goal from the player.

In late August 2013, with the Yellow Submarine back in the top flight, Costa renewed his contract with the club until June 2017. He scored his first goal in the competition on 10 May 2014, his team's last in a 4–0 home win over Rayo Vallecano. In January 2017, his link was again extended to 2021.

On 13 August 2019, Costa returned to Valencia on a season-long loan. He made his debut four days later, starting in a 1–1 draw against Real Sociedad at the Mestalla Stadium; the decade-long difference between two appearances set a club record previously held by Juan Sánchez in the 1990s.

Costa was released by Villarreal at the end of 2020–21, after his contract expired.

Mallorca
On 7 July 2021, Costa joined newly-promoted RCD Mallorca on a two-year deal.

Career statistics

Club

Honours
Villarreal
UEFA Europa League: 2020–21

References

External links

CiberChe biography and stats 
Stats and bio at Cadistas1910 

1988 births
Living people
Footballers from Valencia (city)
Spanish footballers
Association football defenders
La Liga players
Segunda División players
Segunda División B players
Tercera División players
Valencia CF Mestalla footballers
Valencia CF players
Cádiz CF players
Villarreal CF B players
Villarreal CF players
RCD Mallorca players
UEFA Europa League winning players
Spain youth international footballers